William Alan Stewart Butement  (18 August 1904 – 25 January 1990) was a New Zealand-born British-Australian defence scientist and public servant. A native of New Zealand, he made extensive contributions to radar development in Great Britain during World War II, served as the first chief scientist for the Australian Defence Scientific Service, then ended his professional career with a research position in private business.

Early life
Alan Butement was born at Masterton, New Zealand, the son of New Zealand-born William Butement, physician and surgeon, and his English-born wife Amy Louise Stewart. When Alan was age eight, the family moved to Sydney, where he started at The Scots College. After a year, the family moved again, this time to London, England. He graduated from University College School and then studied at University College, University of London, where he attended lectures by Edward Victor Appleton and received the BSc degree in physics in 1926. He followed this as a research student for two years. He married Ursula Florence Alberta Parish on 17 June 1933.

Achievements in Great Britain

In 1928, Butement joined the War Office's Signals Experimental Establishment (SEE) at Woolwich, London, as a Scientific Officer, developing radio equipment for the British Army. He and an associate, P. E. Pollard, conceived a radio apparatus for the detection of ships. A breadboard test unit, operating at 50 cm (600 MHz) and using pulsed modulation, gave successful laboratory results, but was not of interest to War Office officials. Nevertheless, in January 1931, a writeup on the apparatus was entered in the Inventions Book maintained by the Royal Engineers. This is the first official record in Great Britain of the technology that would eventually become radar.

In October 1936, Robert Watson Watt's team working for the Air Ministry began work on what would become Chain Home (CH). By 1936 they had moved to the Bawdsey Manor Research Centre (on the North Sea coast) and had already begun plans for deployment of the CH system. Referred to as Range and Direction Finding (RDF),  Bawdsey had by this time begun branching out, forming teams to design and build all sorts of radar related devices. An Army Cell from the SEE was attached to the Bawdsey operation. Butement was among those representing the War Office.

At Bawdsey, Butement was assigned to develop a Coastal Defence (CD) RDF system to be used for aiming anti-shipping and anti-aircraft guns. By early 1938, he had a prototype under test. This used a pulsed 1.5 m (200 MHz) transmitter producing 50 kW power, (later increased to 150 kW). For the transmitting and receiving antennas, he developed a large dipole array, 10 feet high and 24 feet wide, giving narrow transmitting and receiving beams. This array could be rotated at a speed around 1.5 revolutions per minute. To improve the directional accuracy, lobe-switching was used in the transmitting array.

Primary credit for introducing beamed RDF systems in Great Britain must be given to Butement. As a part of this development, he formulated the first – at least in Great Britain – mathematical relationship that later became well known as the "radar range equation".

In September 1939, at the start of the war, operations at Bawdsey were distributed to safer locations. The Army Cell joined the Air Defence Experimental Establishment (ADEE) at Christchurch in Dorset on the south coast. At the time of the move, Butement was named an Assistant Director of Scientific Research, and continued to lead the Coastal Defence (CD) research activity. The primary use of the evolving CD system was in aiming searchlights associated with the anti-aircraft guns, and Butement acquired the nickname of 'Mr. Searchlight Radar.' He also developed what became the standard method of determining miss-distance of gunfire against shipping by using RDF echoes from splashes caused by shells hitting the sea.

There was an urgent need to improve the effectiveness of the anti-aircraft guns. With his background in radio, in October 1939 Butement turned to this technology as a potential solution. He conceived of a highly compact RDF set placed on the projectile, setting off the detonation when close proximity to the target was attained. He completed the circuit design, but there was the problem of packaging such a device in a small projectile, as well as the question of the vacuum tubes surviving the acceleration forces at firing.

The demands on personnel and funds at the start of the war were such that little more was done at that time. In less than a year, however, (in September 1940), Butement's concept was moved dramatically toward mass production when it was exported under the technology transfer arrangements of the Tizard Mission, and subsequently a variation of his circuit became adopted in the United States as the proximity fuse or VT (variable-time) fuse, the most-manufactured electronic device of the war. In the later stages of the war, anti-aircraft shells fitted with proximity fuses played a major part in defeating both German V-1 flying bomb attacks on London, and Japanese kamikaze attacks on Allied shipping. As well as the dramatic breaking of Japanese Naval air power in the Battle of the Philippine Sea, it immortalised the invention's impact with the battle's alternate name: The Great Marianas Turkey Shoot, where the battle losses were so severe that it led to the Japanese adoption of the kamikaze. Years later, Butement said that he considered the proximity fuse as his most significant accomplishment.

As the war got under way, it was realised that the Chain Home (CH) system needed an additional ability to detect low-flying aircraft. The CD RDF was ideal for this function, and was soon added at most CH stations as the Chain-Home Low (CHL). For making the necessary adaptations, Butement led the effort at the Air Defence Experimental Establishment (ADEE).

In February 1940, Harry Boot and John Randall at Birmingham University built a high-power cavity magnetron, allowing signal-generation at microwave frequencies. In the autumn of 1940, the device was brought to America by the Tizard Mission, and development of microwave radars was started on both sides of the Atlantic. (The Tizard Mission also brought back to Great Britain the name 'radar' – adopted as a cover by the US Navy in 1940.)

The ADEE was reformed into the Air Defence Research and Development Establishment (ADRDE) in mid-1941. Applications of the CD system and the work of Butement were even more important as microwave devices were added. Germany began bomber attacks on the British mainland, and it was decided that radar research and development activities would be moved further inland. In May 1942, the ADRDE was transferred to Malvern, Worcestershire, where it remained for many years.

In 1943, Butement, then Assistant Director of Scientific Research with the Ministry of Supply, invented and supervised the development of a secure radio-based method of battlefield communication using narrow beams of pulsed microwave signals, to replace the traditional telephone cable. Using a 10 cm (3 GHz) transmitter and receiver developed for radar, the Wireless Station No. 10 evolved. Called one of the electronic wonders of WWII, this was the first multi-channel, microwave communication system in Great Britain. It first went operational in July 1944, just after D-Day, and served as the central communications backbone for the British march across Europe to victory.

Achievements in Australia

After the War, the British and Australian governments established a joint project on research and development of guided missiles. The project included laboratory and workshop facilities at Salisbury, South Australia, and a rocket test range at a new town, Woomera, in the Australian Outback. Butement was selected as Deputy-Chief Scientist of the project and moved to Australia in early 1947. As a British subject, he was eligible to hold official positions in Australia, and, shortly after arriving, he was appointed Chief Superintendent of the project.

In April 1949, Butement took a new position as the first Chief Scientist in the Defence Scientific Service of the Australian Department of Supply and Development. His responsibilities encompassed laboratories for high-speed aerodynamics, propulsion, and electronics, all closely linked with the Anglo-Australian joint project. In 1955, all of these activities, including the joint project, were merged to form the Weapons Research Establishment (WRE) reporting to Butement in Melbourne.

Under Butement, the WRE established working facilities and conditions highly suited for scientific research. Hundreds of university graduates were recruited and sent to Great Britain for research training. While by this time Butement was primarily a research administrator rather than a hands-on scientist, he did personally initiate several highly important developments, including a rocket engine that used a semi-solid paste pressed into the firing chamber as propellant, and the Malkara missile, an anti-tank guided weapon that was adopted as standard equipment by the Australian and British armies.

Butement encouraged the WRE to establish working links with scientists and engineers at the University of Adelaide, in Adelaide, South Australia.  In this, he personally submitted a thesis describing his principal contributions to defence technologies and was awarded the Doctor of Science (D.Sc.) degree in 1961.

He had a leading role in Great Britain's testing of nuclear weapons in Australia. He led the party that identified the Monte Bello Islands in Western Australia and Emu Field in South Australia as suitable sites, and was one of three observers representing the Australian Government at atomic tests on these sites in 1952 and 1953, respectively. Another mainland site, at Maralinga, South Australia, was later selected, and Butement was a member of the board that managed the construction of this site, and was also a member of the test safety committee preparing for detonations there in 1956 and 1957.

Butement resigned his position with the WRE in 1966, to become, for a five-year term, Director of Research for Plessey Pacific Pty Ltd, the Australian subsidiary of Plessey, a major British electronics manufacturer.

In 1969 Butement wrote a paper to the Australian Industrial Research Group, advocating the formation of an Australian academy of applied science. From this, the Australian Academy of Technological Sciences and Engineering was formed in 1975. Butement, a member of both the steering committee and the council of the new academy, was appointed an honorary fellow in 1979.

After retirement from Plessey in 1972, Butement remained in Melbourne where he was an enthusiastic amateur radio (ham) operator (call sign VK3AD) and an adept carpenter, metalworker, and mechanic. He was a committed Christian, adhering to the Catholic Apostolic Church and later the Anglican Church. Survived by his wife Ursula Florence Alberta Parish and two daughters Ann and Jane, he died on 25 January 1990, at Richmond, Melbourne.

Recognition

 In 1946 Butement was honoured as an Officer of the Order of the British Empire (OBE).
 In 1959 he was promoted to Commander of the Order (CBE).
 The Butement Laboratory of the High Frequency Radar Division at the Department of Defence's Weapons Research Establishment in Salisbury, South Australia was named in his honour.
 The main village square in the town of Woomera in the outback of South Australia is named "Butement Square" in his honour.

Reference notes

General references

Home, R. W. "Butement, William Alan Stewart (1904–1990)", Australian Dictionary of Biography, National Centre of Biography, Australian National University 
Swords, S. S.; Technical History of the Beginnings of Radar, Peter Peregrinus, Ltd, 1986
Watson, Raymond C. Jr.; Radar Development Worldwide, Trafford Publishing, 2009
Williams, Betty; Dr. W. A. S. Butement: the First Chief Scientist for Defence, Bib ID 1492798, Australian Govt. Pub. Service, 1991
Wisdom, John; A History of Defence Science in Australia, Defence Science and Technology Organisation, 1995.

Radar pioneers
Australian scientists
British scientists
1904 births
1990 deaths
Chief Defence Scientists
Alumni of University College London
Commanders of the Order of the British Empire
Amateur radio people
New Zealand emigrants to the United Kingdom